The Rocky Road is a 1910 American short silent drama film directed by D. W. Griffith and starring Frank Powell. Prints of the film survive in the film archives of the Library of Congress and the Museum of Modern Art.

Cast
 Frank Powell as Ben
 Stephanie Longfellow as Ben's Wife
 George Nichols as The Farmer
 Linda Arvidson
 Kate Bruce as The Maid
 Charles Craig as A Farmhand / At Church
 Adele DeGarde
 Gladys Egan as At Church
 Frank Evans as In Bar
 Edith Haldeman as The Daughter, as a Child
 James Kirkwood as The Best Man
 Henry Lehrman as Outside Bar
 Marion Leonard
 Wilfred Lucas
 W. Chrystie Miller as The Minister
 Owen Moore
 Anthony O'Sullivan as In Bar
 Harry Solter
 Blanche Sweet as The Daughter, at Eighteen
 J. Waltham as In Bar
 Dorothy West as At Church (unconfirmed)

See also
 List of American films of 1910
 D. W. Griffith filmography
 Blanche Sweet filmography

References

External links

1910 films
American silent short films
American black-and-white films
1910 drama films
Films directed by D. W. Griffith
1910 short films
Biograph Company films
Silent American drama films
1910s American films
1910s English-language films
English-language drama films
American drama short films